The Walther PPX is a semi-automatic pistol developed by the German company Carl Walther GmbH Sportwaffen of Ulm as a low cost duty pistol. It is available in 9×19mm Parabellum and .40 S&W. 

The pistol, along with its sister design, the Walther Creed, was intended to appeal to the low-cost handgun market. However, due to low sales, both pistols were discontinued within a few years.

Design
"PPX" stands for "Police Pistol Xtreme". The PPX achieved its low price point partly by simplifying its barrel. The PPX has a forged steel barrel that is attached to an MIM sleeve that locks into the frame and slide. This is a similar design to many modern bolt-action hunting rifles, but the PPX marked the first time this process was used on a handgun and Walther has patented the design. According to Walther Arms, the PPX design was tested for almost four years and over half a million rounds were used. 

The Walther PPX was offered in a 4 inch non-threaded, 4.25 inch non-threaded (for the Canadian market) or 4.6 inch threaded barrel configuration. On threaded barrel models there is a small removable protective cap installed on the threads of the barrel crown. The PPX was made from a black polymer frame with either a tenifer coated slide or a stainless steel slide. The sights are dovetailed into the slide and are made from steel. The pistol came from the factory with a carry case and two 16-round magazines, or three 10 round magazines for areas with magazine capacity restrictions. The PPX and Creed share the same magazines and both designs allow the magazines to drop free. 

Internally, the PPX includes a reversible magazine release, two drop safety mechanisms and a firing pin block safety. There is no magazine disconnect safety, meaning the pistol will fire with a round in the chamber even if the magazine is removed. The Walther PPX has no other external manual safety mechanism, making it a simple and clean design but one that requires a holster that completely protects the trigger, particularly if the pistol is to be carried with a round in the chamber. The PPX also has a standard integral polymer M1913 Picatinny rail for attaching lights or laser sights. 

The PPX features a grip frame designed according to other ergonomic Walther grips such as the one found on the PPQ. However, the PPX's frame lacks the interchangeable backstraps of other Walther designs. 
The pistol frame has an integral Picatinny rail below the barrel. A small lanyard hole is molded into the frame behind the magazine well. It is a hammer fired pistol but the hammer is partially cocked by the action after each round is fired making for a very light and crisp trigger pull similar in feel to a striker fired pistol. There is no second strike capability.

Reception
The PPX was generally praised for its trigger and ergonomics. Its reliability and price point were praised almost universally. However, its blocky appearance and tall slide, resulting in a high bore axis, generated criticism. Walther attempted to address some complaints about the PPX with the similar Creed, but both pistols failed to gain a foothold in the market and both were later discontinued by Walther in favor of the higher-end PPQ.

References

External links

 Walther PPX on the Walther Arms (USA Walther) website
 Walther PPX Manual
 Walther PPX on the official German Walther website

Walther semi-automatic pistols